Indus Public School, Jind is a nonprofit day-boarding school in Vijay Nagar, Jind, Haryana, India.

History
School was founded by Industrialist and Philanthropist Chaudhary Sri. Mitter Sen Sindhu in 2002 (late) under Sindhu Education Foundation that runs several educational trusts and institutes under Indus Group of Institutions and Param Mitra Manav Nirman Sansthan.

Late Ch. Mitter Sen Sindhu founded The Indus Education and Research Centre (IERC), Jind during the year 2002. The IERC, a non – profit making trust mainly aims at imparting quality education through a nationwide network of public schools. One of such branches established at Vijay Nagar, Urban Estate, Jind started functioning from the academic session 2003 – 2004 (April 2003).

Description
The school is affiliated with Indus Group of institutions (one of the largest institutions providing education at school level in India) and  Central Board of Secondary Education, New Delhi (CBSE). The school has well-equipped laboratories, libraries, computer rooms, classrooms, sports facilities, music room, medical treatment room, and school transport.

See also
 Dr. Ekta Sindhu
 Indus Group of Institutions
 Param Mitra Manav Nirman Sansthan
 Education in India
 Literacy in India 
 List of institutions of higher education in Haryana

References

External links
 Indus Public School, Jind  - Official Website

Boarding schools in Haryana
Schools in Haryana
Jind district